This article lists the Canadian number-one albums of 1970. The chart was compiled and published by RPM every Saturday (except September 6 and 13, both of which were Sundays).

The top position (December 27, 1969, Vol. 12, No. 19) preceding January 10, 1970 (Vol. 12, No. 20-21) was The Beatles' Abbey Road. Four acts held the top position in the albums and singles charts simultaneously: Simon & Garfunkel on March 14 – April 4, The Guess Who on May 16 – 23, Creedence Clearwater Revival on September 20 – October 10 and George Harrison on December 26.

(Entries with dates marked thus* are not presently on record at Library and Archives Canada and were inferred from the following week's listing. September 13's listing presently has that of August 22; hence, the reading was inferred from the following week's chart. There was no publication on May 30; chart listings indicate the week was discounted.)

References

See also
1970 in music
RPM number-one hits of 1970

1970 in Canada
1970 in Canadian music
1970